Nikolaj Krag Christensen (born 12 August 1998) is a Danish professional ice hockey forward currently playing for the Frederikshavn White Hawks of the Danish Metal Ligaen.

Christensen was selected by the St. Louis Blues in the seventh round (209th overall) of the 2016 NHL Entry Draft.

Career statistics

Regular season and playoffs

International

References

External links
 

1998 births
Living people
Danish ice hockey forwards
Frederikshavn White Hawks players
Lempäälän Kisa players
People from Rødovre
Rødovre Mighty Bulls players
Rögle BK players
Rungsted Seier Capital players
St. Louis Blues draft picks
Sportspeople from the Capital Region of Denmark